Lakhapadar is a village and former non-salute princely state on the Saurashtra peninsula in Gujarat, western India.

According to Census 2011 information the location code or village code of Lakhapadar village is 515721. Lakhapadar village is located in Dhari Tehsil of Amreli district in Gujarat, India. It is situated 22km away from sub-district headquarter Dhari and 37km away from district headquarter Amreli. As per 2009 stats, Lakhapadar village is also a gram panchayat.

The total geographical area of village is 1596.31 hectares. Lakhapadar has a total population of 1,243 peoples. There are about 255 houses in Lakhapadar village. Savar Kundla is nearest town to Lakhapadar which is approximately 37km away.

Population of Lakhapadar

Total Population: 1243
Male Population : 616
Female Population : 627

Connectivity of Lakhapadar

Type
Status
Public Bus Service
Available within village
Private Bus Service
Available within 10+ km distance
Railway Station
Available within 10+ km distance

Nearby villages of Lakhapadar:

Gigasan

Kubda

Amaratpur

Devla

Nagadhra

Virpur

Madhupur

Dabhali

Jira

Sarasiya

Facharia

Visiting places in Lakhapadar
 Gaumukhi Ganga
 Temple of Hanumanji on river front of Shel.
 Budheshwer Mahadev temple on Triveni river
 Lakhapadar Dam
 Gatrad mataji Temple

History 
The petty princely state, in Sorath prant, was ruled by Kathi Chieftains.

In 1901 it comprised only the village, with a population of 544, yielding 3,900 Rupees state revenue (1903-4, mostly from land), paying 178 Rupees tribute to the Gaekwar Baroda State and Junagadh State. 

To know more history : please read book of  '''Zaverchand Megahni's''' book ''' SAURASHTRA NI RASDHAR, History of Hirbai...

References

External links and sources 
 Imperial Gazetteer, on DSAL.UChicago.edu - Kathiawar

Princely states of Gujarat